Elachista archaeonoma is a species of moth in the family Elachistidae. It was first described by Edward Meyrick in 1889. It is endemic to New Zealand.

Taxonomy
This species was first described by Edward Meyrick in 1889 and named Elachista archaeonoma. In 1928 George Hudson discussed and illustrated this species in his 1928 book The butterflies and moths of New Zealand.

Description
Hudson described this species as follows:

Distribution
This species is endemic to New Zealand.

Behaviour
Adults have been recorded on wing in December and January.

Host species
The larvae of this species are grass leaf miners.

References

Moths described in 1889
archaeonoma
Moths of New Zealand
Endemic fauna of New Zealand
Taxa named by Edward Meyrick
Endemic moths of New Zealand